Kaj Gabriel Franck (9 November 1911 Vyborg, Grand Duchy of Finland – 26 September 1989 Santorini, Greece) was one of the leading figures of Finnish design and an influential figure in design and applied arts between 1940 and 1980.

Franck's parents were Kurt Franck and Genéviève "Vevi" Ahrenberg. He was a Swedish-speaking Finn, and he was of German descent through his father.

Franck was artistic director of the Arabia ceramics company (now part of Iittala Group) and artistic director and teacher at the College of Applied Arts – the predecessor of the University of Art and Design Helsinki (now Aalto University) – since 1945, but created designs for other companies as well. He was awarded the Prince Eugen Medal in 1964.

The Design Forum Finland awards the yearly Kaj Franck Design Prize to a designer or team of designers working in the spirit of the late Kaj Franck. Recipients of the prize include Oiva Toikka (1992), Yrjö Kukkapuro (1995), Heikki Orvola (1998), Eero Aarnio (2008), Simo Heikkilä (2011) and Harri Koskinen (2014).

The Mint of Finland released a collector coin with the theme “Kaj Franck and Industrial Art” in January 2011. The coin commemorates the one hundredth anniversary of his birth.

He is buried in the Hietaniemi Cemetery in Helsinki.

References

External links 

Glass items designed by Kaj Franck

1911 births
1989 deaths
Finnish designers
Finnish interior designers
Artists from Vyborg
Recipients of the Prince Eugen Medal
Burials at Hietaniemi Cemetery
Finnish people of German descent
Swedish-speaking Finns
Academic staff of the Aalto University School of Arts, Design and Architecture

Compasso d'Oro Award recipients